Source Hill is a cinder cone in northwestern British Columbia, Canada. It is polygenetic in nature, having erupted more than once throughout its eruptive history. It is one of the volcanoes in the central portion of the Mount Edziza volcanic complex and last erupted during the Pleistocene period.

See also
List of volcanoes in Canada
List of Northern Cordilleran volcanoes
Volcanology of Canada
Volcanology of Western Canada

References

Cinder cones of British Columbia
Mount Edziza volcanic complex
Polygenetic cinder cones
One-thousanders of British Columbia